Kike Oniwinde is a British former javelin thrower, and the co-founder of BYP Network. BYP Network is a platform that connects Black professionals with each other and corporations.

Early life and education
Oniwinde was born in 1992 and as a child lived in East London with her mother and two brothers. She took Economics and double Maths at A-level, gaining 'A' grades, and then entered the University of Nottingham, graduating with Upper Second class BSc Economics in 2014. She then studied at University of Florida, supported by a track and field scholarship, and gained an MSc degree in Management.

Athletics career
Her skill with the javelin was recognised and she competed from 2005 onwards for Havering Athletics Club, moving to Enfield and Haringey Athletic Club in 2012. She first represented Great Britain at the European Junior Championships in Tallinn in 2011.

She won three medals in the British University Championships while at University of Nottingham, although a back injury affected her performance. While at University of Florida, she was in the university athletics team and reached the top twenty in performance with the javelin in the USA Collegiate competitions. She qualified for the Commonwealth Games. She continued competing until 2017.

Financial career
Oniwinde was an intern at Goldman Sachs and Citi Investment Bank while a student, and worked for a financial technology start-up after graduation. In 2016 she founded the BYP Network App to connect black young professionals with each other and corporations. In 2019 it had 30,000 members in 65 countries. She undertook the NEF Fast Track programme to support her development as an entrepreneur.

BYP Network 
BYP Network, often dubbed 'the LinkedIn for black professionals', has now grown to a platform of tens of thousands of members across the globe. With a focus on changing the black narrative to one focused on aspirations, attainability and achievement, BYP is now a community that connects black professionals with each other and corporations. Oniwinde noticed a significant gap in the social media network area which connected black professionals in one place. The BYP app encompasses social networking and career development, specifically focusing on the D&I space. It has transformed this area with a variety of features, from platforms for black groups to connect and collaborate, an in-app job board, live events and much more all in one place.

In 2019, BYP Network hosted a Senior Leadership Conference which attracted 900 attendees, and guest speakers from senior professionals in industries within Tech, Finance. Over August and July, BYP aimed to scale their business through an equity crowdfund campaign with seedrs, and within five days of going public, they raised £500,000 with over 1,000 investors. In August, BYP announced a total raise of over £850,000 ($1.1m), meaning Kike became one of thirty-five female founders to have raised over $1million.

Awards
She was awarded the Southeastern Conference Academic Honor award for her MSc Management degree and athletics by University of Florida.

In 2018 Oniwinde was included in the Financial Times and Inclusive Board's first list of Top 100 UK BAME Leaders in Tech.

In 2019 she was included in a list of young leaders within technology in Europe (Forbes' 30 under 30) and was one of the 2019 Maserati 100, a list produced by Maserati and the Sunday Times.

In December 2019, Oniwinde was awarded the Alumni Laureate Recent Graduate Award by University of Nottingham.

References

1993 births
Living people
Alumni of the University of Nottingham
University of Florida alumni
British company founders
British female athletes
Black British sportswomen